The 2019 season was the 12th season for the Indian Premier League franchise Mumbai Indians. They were one of the eight teams competing in the 2019 Indian Premier League. Mumbai Indians defeated the Chennai Super Kings by 1 run to win the final for their fourth title.

Background

Player retention, transfers and auction

In November 2018, Mumbai Indians announced their list of retained players for the 2019 season. The list included Rohit Sharma, Hardik Pandya, Jasprit Bumrah, Krunal Pandya, Ishan Kishan, Suryakumar Yadav, Mayank Markande, Rahul Chahar, Anukul Roy, Siddhesh Lad, Aditya Tare, Quinton de Kock, Evin Lewis, Kieron Pollard, Ben Cutting, Mitchell McClenaghan, Adam Milne and Jason Behrendorff.

Preseason
In February 2019, Netflix released an eight-part documentary series based on Mumbai Indians' 2018 season called Cricket Fever: Mumbai Indians.

On 1 March 2019, Colors was signed up as the team's principal sponsor for the season.

Team analysis
ESPNcricinfos Vishal Dikshit opined that Mumbai's strength is their batting lineup "which has become even stronger" with the addition of Quinton de Kock while calling lack of depth in the spin department as their "biggest concern". Cricbuzz, however, stated that "the firepower the bowling department" is their strength and the uncertainty over Rohit Sharma's position in the batting order as "one of the biggest headaches." According to NDTV, "The perfect mixture of experience and young talent make Mumbai Indians one of the favourites to lift the trophy once more." News18 wrote "Mumbai's USP is their Indian contingent", while the Indian Express suggested that Jasprit Bumrah and Hardik Pandya could be rested during the latter stages of the season ahead of the World Cup.

Squad 
 Players with international caps are listed in bold.

Coaching and support staff

 Head coach – Mahela Jayawardene
 Batting coach – Robin Singh
 Bowling coach - Shane Bond
 Fielding coach – James Pamment
 Mentor - Sachin Tendulkar
 Team manager - Rahul Sanghvi
 Director of cricket operations - Zaheer Khan

Ref

Season
League table

Results
League matches

 Playoffs 
Qualifier 1

 Final 

Statistics
Most runs

 Source:Cricinfo

Most wickets

 Source:'Cricinfo

Player of the match awards

References

External links
Official Website

2019 Indian Premier League
Mumbai Indians seasons